Gajševci is a settlement in the Municipality of Križevci in northeastern Slovenia. It lies on the Ščavnica River, next to a small lake. The area is part of the traditional region of Styria. It is now included with the rest of the municipality in the Mura Statistical Region.

References

External links
Gajševci on Geopedia

Populated places in the Municipality of Križevci